Cystosoma is a genus of cicada in of the Cicadinae subfamily native to Australia. Two species have been described.

References

Hemiptera of Australia
Chlorocystini
Cicadidae genera